The Prankster is a 2010 American teen-comedy film directed by Tony Vidal and featuring Matt Angel, Danny Max, Kunal Sharma, Preston Davis, Madison Riley, and Veronica Sixtos in lead roles, and Georges Corraface, Robert Adamson, Devon Werkheiser, Kurt Fuller, Jareb Dauplaise, and Ally Maki in supporting roles. The film was produced, directed and written by Tony Vidal and was his debut as a director. It was filmed at San Rafael High School.

Plot
The Pranksters are a secret society that rights the wrongs of high school. Its leader, Chris, longs for more with graduation looming. Under the guidance of his eccentric Uncle Nick, Chris embarks on a challenging path of self-discovery and romance.

Cast
 Matt Angel as Chris Karas
 Danny Max as Larry Fasco
 Kunal Sharma as Vish Amritraj
 Preston Davis as Nathan 'Owl' Owsley
 Madison Riley as Tiffany Fowler 
 Veronica Sixtos as Mariah Rivera
 Georges Corraface as Nick Caras/Uncle Nick
 Devon Werkheiser as Brad Burris
 Kurt Fuller as Dean Pecarino
 Jareb Dauplaise as Blotto Wojonowski
 Ally Maki as Kassandra Yamaguchi
 Robert Adamson as Eric Hood

References

External links

2010 films
American teen comedy films
2010s teen comedy films
2010 comedy films
2010s American films